Dalem is a village in the Dutch province of South Holland. It is located in the municipality of Gorinchem, about 2 km east of the city.

It was first mentioned in 1343 as Dalem, and means "low-lying settlement". It should not be confused with the nearby hamlet Laag-Dalem which has become a neighbourhood of Gorinchem. Dalem is a dike village which probably developed around the 11th century along the Boven-Merwede. The Dutch Reformed church is an aisleless church with a doomed roof. An obelisk has been placed on top of the roof. In 2001, it was discovered that the roof had become unstable, and the local congregation could not afford a restoration. In 2004, it was sold to the municipality and restored.

Dalem was a separate municipality until 1818, when it was renamed to "Vuren", the name of the other village in the municipality. The village was part of the province of Gelderland until 1986, when the municipality of Vuren ceased to exist, and Dalem became part of Gorinchem, thereby becoming part of the province of South Holland.

Gallery

References

Populated places in South Holland
Former municipalities of Gelderland
Gorinchem